Gojko Đogo  (Serbian Cyrillic: Гојко Ђого; born 21 November 1940) is a Serb poet.

A dissident, he was imprisoned in SFR Yugoslavia during the 1980s on the basis of verbal offence for "defaming the memory of Josip Broz Tito".

In December 1989, he was one of the founders of the Democratic Party in, Serbia. Đogo is a member of the Academy of Sciences and Arts of the Republika Srpska (ANURS).

In October 1991, a phone conversation between Đogo and Radovan Karadžić was recorded, in which Karadžić says that around 300,000 Muslims living in Sarajevo may be killed in the upcoming war, and Đogo is heard commenting "They should all be slaughtered. All of them."

Works
Tuga pingvina, 1967
Kukuta,1978
Vunena vremena, 1982
Izabrane i nove pesme, 1986
Crno runo, 2002

References

Living people
1940 births
People from Ljubinje
Serbs of Bosnia and Herzegovina
Serbian male poets
Yugoslav dissidents
Members of the Academy of Sciences and Arts of the Republika Srpska
Democratic Party (Serbia) politicians